William Bertram Turrill FRS OBE FLS (14 June 1890 – 15 December 1961) was an English botanist.

Education
He was born in Woodstock, Oxfordshire to William Banbury and Thirza Mary (née Homan) Turrill and educated at the Woodstock National School.

He served with the Royal Army Medical Corps of the British Army during the First World War, mainly on the Macedonian front.

Career
Turrill worked in the Royal Botanic Gardens at Kew and was responsible for many innovations including a mathematical classification of leaf shapes.

Awards and honours
Turrill received the Order of the British Empire in 1955 and the gold medal of the Linnean Society in 1958. He was elected a Fellow of the Royal Society in March 1958 as someone: 

This botanist is denoted by the author abbreviation Turrill when citing a botanical name.

Personal life
He married Florence Homan in 1918.

Eponymy 
The plant species Veronica turrilliana, Symplocos turrilliana, Cryptocarya turrilliana, Astragalus turrillii and Cyperus turrillii are named after him.

References

External links

1890 births
1961 deaths
People from Woodstock, Oxfordshire
Botanists with author abbreviations
English botanists
Veitch Memorial Medal recipients
Victoria Medal of Honour recipients
Fellows of the Royal Society
Fellows of the Linnean Society of London
New Naturalist writers
Officers of the Order of the British Empire
Military personnel from Oxfordshire
British Army personnel of World War I
Royal Army Medical Corps soldiers